J13 may refer to:

Roads 
 County Route J13 (California)
 Johor State Route J13, in Malaysia

Vehicles 
 GNR Class J13, a British steam locomotive class
 , a Visby-class destroyer of the Swedish Navy
 Shenyang J-13, a cancelled Chinese light fighter aircraft

Other uses 
 Bacterial pneumonia
 Pentagonal bipyramid, a Johnson solid (J13)
 J13, a Nissan J engine